Sulentic, Šulentić is a Croatian surname. Notable people with the surname include:

Ive Sulentic (born 1979), Canadian soccer player
Nicholas Sulentic (1887–?), Croatian-born American businessman
Zlatko Šulentić (1893–1971), Croatian painter

Croatian surnames